Elena Likhovtseva and Iroda Tulyaganova were the defending champions, but chose not to participate that year. In the final, wildcards Liezel Huber and Sania Mirza defeated 3rd seeds Li Ting and Sun Tiantian 7–6(7–1), 6–4 to win their title.

Seeds

Qualifying

Draw

2004 WTA Tour
Bangalore Open